is a former Japanese football player. He played for Japan national team.

Club career
Tsuzuki was born in Heguri, Nara on April 18, 1978. After graduating from Kunimi High School in Nagasaki, he joined J1 League side Gamba Osaka in 1997. He made his professional debut on November 11, 1998 at Expo '70 Commemorative Stadium. He became the first choice goalkeeper in 2000 dislodging Hayato Okanaka but he was transferred to Urawa Reds at the end of the 2002 season after a row with manager Akira Nishino. At Reds, he battles with Norihiro Yamagishi for the position. From 2005, he completely played as first goalkeeper except for 2006 for injury. The club won the champions 2006 J1 League, 2003 J.League Cup, 2005 and 2006 Emperor's Cup. In Asia, the club won the champions 2007 AFC Champions League and also won the 3rd place 2007 Club World Cup. However his opportunity to play decreased due to injury from 2009. He moved to Shonan Bellmare in June 2010. It announced one's retirement on January 18, 2011.

National team career
In September 2000, Tsuzuki was elected Japan U-23 national team for 2000 Summer Olympics. But he did not play in the match behind Seigo Narazaki.

In February 2001, Tsuzuki was elected Japan national team for 2001 Confederations Cup. At this tournament, on April 8, he debuted against Brazil. Although he played only one game, Japan won the 2nd place. Because Yoshikatsu Kawaguchi and Seigo Narazaki played most matches for Japan in 2000s, Tsuzuki could hardly play in the match. He played 6 games for Japan until 2009.

Club statistics

1Includes other competitive competitions, including the Japanese Super Cup, A3 Champions Cup and FIFA Club World Cup.

National team statistics

Appearances in major competitions

Awards and honours

Club
Urawa Reds
J1 League: 1
 2006
Emperor's Cup: 2
 2005, 2006
J.League Cup: 1
 2003
AFC Champions League: 1
 2007
Japanese Super Cup: 1
 2006

Individual
J.League Best XI: 1
 2007

References

External links

Japan National Football Team Database

1978 births
Living people
Association football people from Nara Prefecture
Japanese footballers
Japan international footballers
J1 League players
Gamba Osaka players
Urawa Red Diamonds players
Shonan Bellmare players
Olympic footballers of Japan
Footballers at the 2000 Summer Olympics
2001 FIFA Confederations Cup players
Association football goalkeepers
Japanese sportsperson-politicians